Maurice Alliot (24 September 1903 – 22 October 1960) was a French Egyptologist. He was a professor of Egyptology at Lyons (from 1937) and Paris (from 1953).

Under the French Institute of Oriental Archaeology from 1930, he participated in excavations of Deir el-Medina and Edfu, the latter of which he wrote two volumes about.

References

French Egyptologists
1903 births
1960 deaths
Members of the Institut Français d'Archéologie Orientale